Jug is a surname. Notable people with the surname include:

 Ažbe Jug (born 1992), Slovenian football goalkeeper
 Klement Jug (1898–1924), Slovenian philosopher, essayist, and mountaineer
 Matej Jug (born 1980), Slovenian football referee
 Lord Toby Jug (born 1965), British politician